Michael A. Figures (October 13, 1947 – September 13, 1996) was an American politician who served in the Alabama Senate from the 33rd district from 1978 until his death in 1996. He served as the body's president pro tempore. His wife Vivian Davis Figures succeeded him in office after his death. He was involved in the investigation of the murder of Michael Donald, who was lynched by white supremacists in 1981.

References

1947 births
1996 deaths
Democratic Party Alabama state senators
20th-century American politicians